Commander William Thomas Turner, OBE, RNR (23 October 1856 – 23 June 1933) was a British merchant navy captain. He is best known as the captain of  when she was sunk by a German torpedo in May 1915.

Career and honors

Early life and career 
Born in Liverpool, England to Charlotte Turner (née Johnson) and Charles Turner, who was a seaman. The younger Turner first set sail aboard the ship Grasmere somewhere between the ages of 8 and 13 (sources vary as to his age). Just like his last voyage on the Lusitania, his first sea voyage also ended in a shipwreck near Ireland, and he swam to the Irish shore to save himself.  Turner served under his father's command on Queen of the Nations. While best known now for his role in the Lusitania disaster, Turner was an excellent navigator who accomplished several crossings at notable speeds, including Liverpool to New York in 12 days in 1910, and was promoted for his skill despite his unsuitably gruff demeanor around passengers. Turner was said to have referred to passengers as, "a load of bloody monkeys who are constantly chattering".

Acts of heroism 
While appointed to Cherborg, Turner gained recognition for personally rescuing a man and a boy who had fallen into the water after Alice Davies was wrecked in a collision with Cherborg. He again gained fame for rescuing a 14-year-old boy who had fallen off the Alexandra Dock, and was awarded the Liverpool Shipwreck and Humane Society's Silver Medal. He received an illuminated address from the Liverpool Shipwreck and Humane Society for rescuing the crew of Vagne in 1897. Turner received the Transport Medal for outstanding service in 1902 when, as Chief Officer of Umbria, he moved troops to South Africa during the Boer War. Turner received yet another illuminated address from the Liverpool Shipwreck and Humane Society upon rescuing the crew of the West Point in 1910.

List of notable vessels Turner served aboard 
 Grasmere
 White Star
 Queen of Nations
 Cherbourg
 Star of the East
 
 
 
 
 
 
 
 
 RMS Transylvania

Career with Cunard 
Turner joined the Cunard Line in 1878 as Fourth Officer, following in his father's footsteps, and left Cunard in 1883 to gain additional experience required for a promotion. Turner gained his captain's licence in 1886, and then rejoined the line in 1889. In 1903, Turner was given his first command, Aleppo. While Cunard initially had concerns about Turner's gruff demeanour and avoidance of passengers, they found to their surprise that passengers actually enjoyed Turner's elusive act and that he was in high demand.

In 1915 the Lusitania was torpedoed and sunk by a German U-boat, and an Admiralty inquiry brought serious charges against Turner. Winston Churchill was directly involved with the case. Although Turner was exonerated, the charges haunted him for the rest of his days, and he lived in seclusion.

SS Ivernia 

In the autumn of 1916, nearly a year after the sinking of Lusitania, Turner was appointed relieving master of the Cunard Line vessel , which had been chartered for use as a troop carrier by the British government. On New Year's Day, 1917, the vessel was torpedoed in the Mediterranean Sea off the Greek coast by a German U-boat, with 2,400 troops aboard. The ship went down fairly quickly with a loss of 36 crew members and 84 troops. Once again, Turner survived the loss of his ship to torpedoes. This time, The New York Times reported, he remained on the bridge until all aboard had departed in lifeboats and rafts, "before striking out to swim as the vessel went down under his feet."

Personal life 
Turner received the nickname Bowler Bill, for his custom of buying a brand new bowler hat upon taking command of a ship and wearing this hat on ship's business.

Turner married his cousin, Alice Elizabeth Hitching, on 31 August 1883. They lived together in Manchester and had two sons, Percy Wilfred (born 1885) and Norman Henry (born 1893). Alice moved out in 1903 with Turner's sons, when the couple separated. They remained separated for the rest of their lives, and Turner lived with his housekeeper and companion Miss Mabel Every. Alice emigrated with Turner's sons to Australia in 1915, following the Admiralty's inquiry, and subsequently relocated to Canada at an unknown date. Without knowing his sons had relocated to Canada with Alice, Turner went in search of them upon being diagnosed with intestinal cancer. In November 1919, Turner retired, telling Mabel, "All I want now is a quiet life." It was at this time he was awarded the O.B.E. at the behest of the Chairman of the Cunard Steam Ship Company Ltd.

Turner died of intestinal cancer on 23 June 1933.

Portrayals 
  Tudor Owen (No Time Like the Past)
  Kenneth Cranham (Sinking of the Lusitania: Terror at Sea)

References

External links
 
 portrait of Turner on board the Aquitania

Ship captains of the Cunard Line
British Merchant Navy officers
Steamship captains
1856 births
1933 deaths
Sailors from Merseyside
People from Crosby, Merseyside
Royal Naval Reserve personnel